Winthrop College Historic District is a national historic district located on the campus of Winthrop University at Rock Hill, South Carolina.  It encompasses 17 contributing buildings and 1 contributing structure constructed between 1894 and 1943. Architectural styles represented include Gothic Revival, Richardsonian Romanesque, Classical Revival, and Colonial Revival.  Notable buildings include the separately listed Tillman Hall and Withers Building, as well as Alumni House, Phelps Dormitory, Thurmond Building, Byrnes
Auditorium, Johnson Hall, and the President's Residence.

It was listed on the National Register of Historic Places in 1987.

References

External links

Historic districts on the National Register of Historic Places in South Carolina
Historic American Buildings Survey in South Carolina
University and college buildings on the National Register of Historic Places in South Carolina
Romanesque Revival architecture in South Carolina
Gothic Revival architecture in South Carolina
Colonial Revival architecture in South Carolina
Neoclassical architecture in South Carolina
Buildings and structures in Rock Hill, South Carolina
National Register of Historic Places in Rock Hill, South Carolina